Lemon Grove School District is a school district located in Lemon Grove, San Diego County, California.

It runs one middle school, two K-8 schools, and four elementary schools. Lemon Grove School district was officially founded on March 18, 1893 when the San Diego County Board of Supervisors and Harry Wagner, County School Superintendent, approved the boundaries of the Lemon Grove District.

The superintendent of the district is Erica Balakian. The district is managed by a five-person Governing Board.

References

External sites 
 LGSD Patch Review
 LGSD NCES Info and Data

Lemon Grove, California
School districts in San Diego County, California
School districts established in 1893
1893 establishments in California